Argyripnus pharos is a species of ray-finned fish in the genus Argyripnus. It is found in the Indian Ocean and West Pacific.

References 

Fish described in 2003
Sternoptychidae